Shawl scrotum is a condition in which the scrotum surrounds the penis, resembling a 'shawl'.

It is a characteristic of some syndromes such as Aarskog-Scott syndrome (faciodigitogenital syndrome), Rubenstein-Taybi syndrome, craniofrontonasal dysplasia, Hunter Carpenter McDonald Syndrome, Naguib Syndrome, Saito-Kuba-Tsuruta syndrome, Ieshima Koeda Inagaki syndrome, Cystic fibrosis Gastritis Megaloblastic Anemia, Willems de Vries syndrome, Schinzel syndrome and Seaver Cassidy syndrome.

References

Conditions of the skin appendages
Scrotum